Cassia abbreviata, commonly known as the sjambok pod or long-tail cassia, is a mostly tropical tree species in the genus Cassia, which is native to Africa.

Native distribution

Cassia abbreviata is native to east, northeast, south, and west-central Africa; found in Botswana, the DRC, Kenya, Mozambique, Namibia, Somalia, South Africa (in the provinces of Limpopo and Mpumalanga), Eswatini, Tanzania, Zambia, and Zimbabwe blums village, Zimbabwe.

Uses
Proguibourtinidins, a type of condensed tannins, can be found in C. abbreviata and guibourtinidol, a flavan-3ol, can be found in its heartwood.

Subspecies
Three subspecies are distinguished on the basis of petal size, pubescence and geographical distribution: 
 Cassia abbreviata subsp. abbreviata
 Cassia abbreviata subsp. beareana (Holmes) Brenan
 Cassia abbreviata subsp. kassneri (Baker f.) Brenan

See also
 List of Southern African indigenous trees and woody lianes

References

External links
 Cassia abbreviata on www.ildis.org
 

abbreviata
Plants described in 1871
Trees of Botswana
Flora of the Democratic Republic of the Congo
Flora of Kenya
Flora of Mozambique
Flora of Namibia
Flora of Somalia
Flora of South Africa
Flora of Swaziland
Flora of Tanzania
Flora of Zambia
Flora of Zimbabwe
Taxa named by Daniel Oliver